Bascom may refer to:

Places and sites
United States
 Bascom, Florida
 Bascom Corner, Indiana
 Bascom, Montana
 Bascom, Ohio
 Bascom, Texas
 Bascom Auxiliary Field
 Bascom B. Clarke House
 Bascom Hill, University of Wisconsin–Madison
 Bascom Hall
 Bascom (VTA), transit station in San Jose, California
 Fort Bascom, New Mexico
 Bascomville, South Carolina

Other uses
Bascom (name), people named Bascom
6084 Bascom, discovered in 1985, a minor planet named for the American geologist Florence Bascom
Bascom Affair, confrontation between army Captain Bascom and Chief Cochise triggered the beginning of the Apache Wars in 1861 at Apache Pass, Arizona
BASCOM, a compiler for Microsoft MBASIC

See also
Bascom Maple Farms, Inc., Alstead, New Hampshire
Bascom Palmer Eye Institute, Florida
Bascomb
Bascome
Bascombe
Baskcomb
Boscombe (disambiguation)